Aram is an Armenian patriarch in the History of Armenia, and a popular masculine name in Aramaic and Armenian. It appears in Hebrew, Aramaic as Aram, son of Shem and in cuneiform as Arame of Urartu.

People with the name
 Aram I (born 1947) birth name Bedros Keshishian, Catholicos, head of the Catholicosate of the Great House of Cilicia (Armenian Apostolic Church), Antelias, Lebanon
 Aram Andonian (1875–1952), Armenian journalist, historian and writer
 Aram Asatryan (1953–2006), Armenian pop singer and songwriter
 Aram Avakian (1926–1987), American film editor and director
 Aram Ayrapetyan (born 1986), Russian football player
 Aram Shahin Davud Bakoyan (born 1954), Iraqi politician
 Aram Bakshian, American speech writer
 Aram Barlezizyan (born 1936), Armenian academic
 Aram Bartholl (born 1972), German artist
 Aram Chobanian (born 1929), American university president
 Aram Gharabekyan, Armenian conductor
 Aram Haigaz (1900–1986), Armenian-American writer
 Aram Hakobyan (born 1979), Soviet born Armenian football player
 Aram Hamparian, American executive director of Armenian National Committee of America
 Aram Hur (born 1971), South Korean educator, publisher, lecturer, and social activist
 Aram Karam (born 1926), Iraqi footballer
 Aram Karamanoukian (1910–1996), Armenian-Syrian army general
 Aram Karapetyan (born 1964), Armenian politician
 Aram Khachaturian (1903–1978), Armenian composer
 Aram Khalili (born 1989), Iranian-Norwegian of Kurdish descent football player
 Aram Manukian (1879–1919), Armenian revolutionary, politician and general
 Aram Miskaryan (1973–2009), Armenian sportsman and actor
 Aram J. Pothier (1854–1928), American governor of Rhode Island
 Aram Ramazyan (born 1978), Armenian boxer
 Aram Roston, American investigative journalist
 Aram Safrastyan (1888–1966), Armenian academic
 Aram Sargsyan (born 1961), Armenian Prime Minister
 Aram Gaspar Sargsyan (born 1949), Armenian politician
 Aram Saroyan (born 1943), Armenian poet, novelist, biographer, memoirist and playwright
 Aram Satian (born 1947), Armenian composer and songwriter
 Aram Shah (fl. 1210–1211), second sultan of the Mamluk Sultanate
 Aram Ter-Ghevondyan (1928–1988), Armenian historian
 Aram Tigran (1934–2009), Armenian singer
 Aram Voskanyan (born 1975), Soviet born Armenian football player
 Aram Yengoyan (1935-2017), professor of anthropology at University of California, Davis

See also
 Aram (surname)
 Armenian patriarch (disambiguation)
 Arame of Urartu

Notes

References 

 
 

Armenian masculine given names
Aramaic-language names